Milk (born June 23, 1987) is the stage name of Daniel P. Donigan, an American drag performer who came to attention on the sixth season of RuPaul's Drag Race, and the third season of RuPaul's Drag Race: All Stars.

Early life
Donigan was raised by a conservative but supportive family in Syracuse, New York. He began ice skating at the age of 9 and eventually became a competitive figure skater, until 2009.

Career 
After moving to New York City in 2012, Donigan began a full-time career as a drag performer. Donigan first gained attention when he appeared on season six of RuPaul's Drag Race in 2014. Out of 14 contestants, Milk placed ninth overall, losing a lip-sync to Trinity K. Bonet in the sixth episode. On October 20, 2017, Donigan was announced as one of the 10 contestants for RuPaul's Drag Race All Stars 3. He was eliminated by Kennedy Davenport in the third episode, placing 8th. He again placed ninth after Morgan McMichaels returned to the competition.

Outside of Drag Race, Donigan has modeled for Marc Jacobs's Spring/Summer 2016 Campaign and Vivienne Westwood's S/S 2018 campaign. He was featured in Perry Ellis's Fall 2018 collection. In print work, he was on the cover of Hello Mr. magazine's third issue and featured in the third issue of Gayletter and in the January 2018 issue of Gay Times. He was featured in a 2014 issue of Next Magazine. He was announced as the new face of Madonna's skincare line, MDNA Skin. In 2017 Milk appeared as Madonna in a video promoting the skincare range, dressing in several of her iconic costumes.

He performed at the Bryant Park Figure-Skating Rink for the Guys On Ice event as charity for the Ali Forney Center.

Music 
Donigan formed the group The Dairy Queens in 2016, whose first single, "Milk It", was released on July 2, 2016. He then released his first solo single, "Touch the Fashion, Change Your Life", which he performed live on the first episode of All Stars 3 in 2017.

Personal life 
Donigan is a former figure skater who qualified to the 2009 U.S. Figure Skating Championships in Junior Ice Dance.

Donigan currently lives in New York City. He was in an open relationship with James B. Whiteside, principal dancer with American Ballet Theatre, for 12 years. In October 2020, Donigan announced on Instagram that they have amicably split.

Filmography

Television

Music Videos

Web
{| class="wikitable plainrowheaders" style="text-align:left;"
|-
! Year
! Title
! Role
! Notes
! 
|-
| 2014
| James St. James: Transformations
| rowspan="12"| Himself
|Guest
|
|-
| 2014–2018
| Milk's LegenDAIRY Looks
| Host
|
|-
| 2014–2017
| #MarcoMarcoShow Backstage
| Model
|
|-
|2014
|Ring My Bell
|Guest
|
|-
|2015
|Drag Queens React
|Part 2
|
|-
|2017
|$TRANGER$ FOR CA$H
|With Kim Chi
|
|-
|2017
|How to Makeup
|Episode: "Milk's Finishing Touches"
|
|-
| 2017
| Craiglist Missed Connections
| Guest
|
|-
|2018
|''Whatcha Packin|Guest
|
|-
|2018
|M.U.G.
|With Kim Chi
|
|-
|2020
|BBC Sport
|Guest
|
|-
|2022
|Out of the Closet 
|Guest
|
|}

 Discography Singles'''

Featured singles

See also
 LGBT culture in New York City
 List of LGBT people from New York City

References

External links 

 
 

1988 births
Living people
American drag queens
American male models
Gay models
LGBT people from New York (state)
People from New York City
People from Syracuse, New York
RuPaul's Drag Race contestants
Milk